The Unveiling is the second studio album and first album released on independent label Solid State Records by post-hardcore band Cry of the Afflicted.

Track listing 
 "Lift the Veil" – 4:02
 "Read Between" – 3:22
 "Built to Fall" – 3:05
 "The Influence of False Pretense" – 4:16
 "A Scar Filled Sky" – 3:42
 "New Hopes, New Dreams" – 3:21
 "Self Defiance" – 3:51
 "Heed the Sound" – 3:25
 "Anchors" – 3:41
 "Penetrate, Illuminate" – 3:23

Personnel 
James Johnson – guitar
Troy Doell – drums
Garrett Packer – vocals
Nik Wagener – bass guitar, vocals
Steve Lockhart – guitar
 Jeff Schneeweis – producer,  audio engineer
 Tue Madsen – mixing
 Troy Glessner – mastering
 Invisible Creature – art direction
 Ryan Clark – design
 Dave Hill – photography

References 

Cry of the Afflicted albums
2007 albums
Solid State Records albums